Cold Harbor is an unincorporated community in Hanover County, Virginia. The Battle of Cold Harbor was fought in the area in 1864, during the American Civil War.

References

Unincorporated communities in Virginia
Unincorporated communities in Hanover County, Virginia